Summit Lake is a lake in Rainy River District, Ontario, Canada. The lake is in the Nelson River system in the Hudson Bay drainage basin. There are no primary inflows, and the primary outflow, on the west side of the lake, is an unnamed creek west to Kishkutena Lake on the Sabaskong River, which flows into Lake of the Woods, and then via the Winnipeg River and Nelson River into Hudson Bay. The Height of Land portage runs from the north tip of the lake to Kishkutena Lake.

References

Lakes of Rainy River District